The following is a list of notable people associated with California State University, Fullerton.

Students 

 Khalil Ahmad (born 1996), basketball player in the Israeli Basketball Premier League

Faculty

University presidents

See also 

 List of people from California

References

External links

Official websites 
 California State University, Fullerton - Homepage
 California State University, Fullerton Alumni Association

Rankings 
 US News School Profile

 
Fullerton people